Guzmania mitis is a plant species in the genus Guzmania. This species is native to Costa Rica, Colombia, and Venezuela.

References

mitis
Flora of Costa Rica
Flora of Venezuela
Flora of Colombia
Plants described in 1932